Pinnacle Financial Partners is an American bank headquartered in Nashville, Tennessee operating in Tennessee, as well as North Carolina, South Carolina, Virginia, Georgia, and Alabama.

History
The company was founded on February 20, 2000, by twelve Nashville businessmen who wished to create a locally-owned financial firm. In May 2002 the company went public on the NASDAQ with the symbol PNFP. Pinnacle gained naming rights for a new skyscraper in Downtown Nashville, The Pinnacle at Symphony Place, and the company leased  in the building, moving in during 2010.

On January 22, 2017, Pinnacle announced it was acquiring BNC Bank of High Point, North Carolina, which has branches in North Carolina, South Carolina and Virginia. The deal, worth $1.9 billion and completed June 16, 2017, gives Pinnacle operations in four states.

Pinnacle Financial Partners currently (as of December 31, 2017) has approximately US$22.2 billion in assets and has 115 offices. In 2020, Fortune magazine ranked Pinnacle Financial Partners at number 14 on their Fortune List of the Top 100 Companies to Work For in 2020, based on an employee survey of satisfaction.

As of December 31, 2022, Pinnacle Financial Partners operated 114 offices, including 48 in Tennessee, 37 in North Carolina, 23 in South Carolina, 10 in Virginia, 3 in Georgia and 2 in Alabama.

On June 17, 2021, Pinnacle announced its headquarters would move to four floors of a 34-story tower in Nashville Yards, and that the bank's name would appear on top of the building.

Programs

Shared Equity Program 
In 1996 the Housing Fund was created; they are a group which assists first time homebuyers in putting a down payment on their homes. On July 21, 2021, Pinnacle Financial Partners gave a $10 million investment towards their Shared Equity Program. This program provides low income individuals and families with the opportunities and means to buy their first home; by increasing homeownership to previously underserved and marginalized communities, there is a positive push towards increasing the accessibility and affordability of houses. The program is split into three parts: the homebuyers must be able to pay 1% of the price of the home, the program pays for 35%, and the loan from Pinnacle supplies the last 74%. As time goes on, the homeowners can steadily pay off the loan. This was somewhat modeled off of the concept of limited equity in order to build up the wealth for lower income people, allowing them to obtain access to opportunities that would result in an increase in wealth and prosperity.  

This program has many similarities to a typical community land trust. Additionally, this process disincentivizes gentrification and housing displacement, and creates a healthy foundation for affordable housing.

References

External links

Economy of the Southeastern United States
Companies based in Nashville, Tennessee
Banks based in Tennessee
American companies established in 2000
Banks established in 2000
Companies listed on the Nasdaq
2000 establishments in Tennessee
2002 initial public offerings